Florence Ruth Gilbert  (26 March 1917 – 11 April 2016) was a New Zealand poet whose work has been widely published in New Zealand and Commonwealth countries. She was born in Greytown and educated at Hamilton High School and the Otago School of Physiotherapy.

Her poetry appeared first in magazines and anthologies and later in ten personal collections. She was awarded the Jessie Mackay Memorial Award for verse three times. She has served as President of New Zealand PEN and the New Zealand Women Writers' Society.

In the 2002 Queen's Birthday and Golden Jubilee Honours, she was appointed an Officer of the New Zealand Order of Merit, for services to poetry.

Family background and early life 

Ruth Gilbert comes from the same family as the librettist W.S. Gilbert (the surname was originally French). Her father, Henry George Gilbert, was born 1881 in Cust, Canterbury, into a farming family. In his youth, having left primary school and home, he worked his way around the world, visiting relatives in Hampshire, England. He enlisted in the Mounted Rifles in the Boer War at 19, giving a false age. He was educated as a late entrant at Otago University, completing the work for an MA about 1914, but was never awarded the degree as he had not matriculated. Responding to an invitation to train as a Presbyterian minister (although an Anglican by upbringing) he spent four years at Knox College. He was the top student in his years in Hebrew and Greek. He married in 1914, and in 1917 went to France as a padre with the artillery with the rank of Captain. He was the Minister of the St. Andrew's Presbyterian Church Hamilton 1925–1946. After retiring in 1946, he lived in Hamilton, dying in 1954. He played the violin and the cello and was a violin maker (luthier).

Ruth's mother, Florence Margaret Carrington, was born in 1886 in Dunedin. Her father was an artist, G. W. Carrington, and her mother was Irish. A gifted musician, she became a music teacher, and was official accompanist for visiting artists in Dunedin. She played the piano, pipe organ and cello. Marrying in 1914, she had four children, of whom Ruth was the second.

Ruth Gilbert was born in 1917 at Greytown in the Wairarapa during her mother's visit to the Featherston Military Camp where Captain Gilbert was training. She lived until 8 years old in Invercargill; thereafter in Hamilton city overlooking the river from 1925 till 1935. She was educated at Hamilton West Primary School and at Hamilton Girls' High School. In 1935 she trained at what is now the Dunedin School of Physiotherapy, completing her diploma in 1938. During 1938 to 1946 she was employed in the Waikato Hospital, Wellington Hospital (Otaki Branch, where she was in charge of the Physiotherapy Department), and Christchurch Hospital. Most of her experience was with young orthopaedic and geriatric patients. Ruth returned home for four years to nurse her mother, who died of cancer in 1943.

For seven years, she was engaged to Rev. John Dinsmore Johnston, born 19 November 1912. Johnston was Irish and Ruth Gilbert's poem "Leprechaun" written 1939 in Irish dialect may relate to him. Johnston studied at Knox College 1937–1938 when presumably he and Ruth Gilbert met. Johnston left New Zealand to serve as a missionary in China, arriving there on 13 March 1941. He was interned during the Japanese occupation of Hong Kong December 1941 – September 1945. He returned to New Zealand on 24 October 1945.

Ruth Gilbert married John Bennett Mackay, a physician specialising in chest diseases. Their marriage took place on VJ Day, the day the Pacific war ended, when "All the bells were ringing."

Works by Ruth Gilbert

Articles, essays and reviews
 Review of Willow Macky's book of poems Ego of Youth in Art in New Zealand 1942 (no 58) p.12
 "The 42nd International PEN Congress, Sydney, Australia", Landfall 125, March 1978
 "Remembering John Schroder 1885–1980" Landfall 136, December 1980

Major poetry collections
 Lazarus and Other Poems 1949
 The Sunlit Hour 1955
 The Luthier 1966
 Collected Poems 1984
 Complete Early Poems, 1938–1944: With Six Later Pieces 1994
 Complete Sappho Poems 1998
 Selected Poems 1941–1998

Limited collections, booklets and reprints
 Early Poems 1938–1944 1988
 More Early Poems 1939–1944 1988
 Breathings 1992
 Dream, Black Night's Child 1993
 Gongyla Remembers 1994
 The Sunlit Hour 2008
 The Lovely Acres and Other Poems 2008
 Lazarus and Other Poems 2009
 Talismans and Later Poems 2009

Poem sequences
(Available separately or in part)
 "Lazarus" (sequence): in Quill 1948 magazine of the Society of Women Writers and Artists, Landfall March 1948, Voices 133 Spring 1948, Lazarus and Other Poems, Collected Poems, Selected Poems
 "Sanatorium": in Lazarus and Other Poems 1949
 "Leah" (sequence): in Lazarus and Other Poems, Collected Poems, Selected Poems
 "Overheard in a Garden": in Lazarus and Other Poems
 "The Blossom of the Branches": in full in The Sunlit Hour and Collected Poems, in part in An Anthology of Commonwealth Verse and Selected Poems
 "The Slow Years Pass": in full in The Sunlit Hour and in an audio/radio presentation, one poem only in Selected Poems
 "And There Shall be no More Death": in full in The Sunlit Hour, in part in Representative Poetry Online from 2009, in part in Collected Poems
 "The Luthier" (sequence): in full in The Luthier and Other Poems, Collected Poems, Selected Poems, and in three audio/radio presentations
 'Fall-out": in full in The Luthier and Other Poems
 "Poems on a Death": in full in The Luthier and Other Poems
 "To Many Stories High": in part in Landfall 117 March 1976, in full in Collected Poems, The Lovely Acres and Other Poems, in part with an addition in Selected Poems
 "The Lovely Acres": in full in Collected Poems, The Lovely Acres and Other Poems, in part in Selected Poems
 "Tusitala's Island" in part in Landfall 127 September 1978, in full in Collected Poems and in The Lovely Acres and Other Poems, in part in Selected Poems
 "Talismans": in part in Islands 3, 8 October 1980, in full in Collected Poems and with others in Talismans and Later Poems, in part in Selected Poems
 "To a Black Poet": in Collected Poems, The Lovely Acres and Other Poems
 "Attitudes": in Collected Poems, The Lovely Acres and Other Poems

Anthologies 
 Lyric Poems of New Zealand 1928–1942
 "Women Poets of New Zealand" in the American literary quarterly Voices No. 133 Spring 1948
 Jindyworobak Anthology 1951 Trans-Tasman Issue
 Poems 1953 Society of New Zealand Women Writers and Artists
 An Anthology of New Zealand Verse 1956
 Delta Anthology of New Zealand Poetry [sound recording] read by William Austin, Tim Eliott, Dorothy McKegg, Anne Flannery 1961
 An Anthology of Commonwealth Verse 1963
 New Zealand Love Poems 1977
 Private Gardens 1977
 The Japonica Sings 1979
 A Cage of Words 1980
 Mystical Choices 1981
 Penguin Book of New Zealand Verse 1985
 My Heart Goes Swimming 1996
 Oxford Anthology of New Zealand Poetry in English 1997
 Jewels in the Water 2000
 Doors 2000
 Ruth Gilbert as Snowtext Poet 2000
 Earth's Deep Breathing 2007
 Whare Korero: Best of Reed Writings 2007
 Representative Poetry Online from 2009
 broadsheet new new zealand poetry 4 November 2009
 Voyagers Science Fiction Poems from New Zealand 2009
 Poetry Archive London Online from 2012

Audio and radio presentations
 "The Slow Years Pass" broadcast by Radio New Zealand Anzac Day 1953. Recording held in Radio New Zealand Sound Archives System ID 33323 Title: The Slow Years Pass Creator/Contributor Gilbert, Ruth Date 20 April 1953.
 "The Luthier" (sequence).  A collection of audio recordings of fifty-one New Zealand poets made in 1974. Original tapes held in the Oral History collection at the Alexander Turnbull Library.  The reel that includes the recording of Ruth Gilbert is reference number OHT7-0027. The tapes have been digitalised, and are available to listen to on site. CD copies are held at the University of Auckland Library in the Special Collections.

Letters 
Unless indicated otherwise held in Turnball Library manuscripts (selected).
 Letters to J. H. E. Schroder
 Letters of Sylvia Ashton-Warner to Ruth Gilbert (Reproduced in Whenua, Letters to Ruth Gilbert. Cultural & Political Booklets)
 Thirty Letters from Ruth Gilbert to Niel Wright (Reproduced in Notes to More Early Poems. Cultural & Political Booklets)
 Letter in defence of Sylvia Ashton-Warner Dominion 18 September 1990
 Letters from Ruth Gilbert (Helen Shaw papers)
 Correspondence with Ruth Gilbert (James Bertram papers)
 The Lovely Acres manuscript sent to Lorna and Monte Holcroft
 Dorothy Buchanan papers
 Peter Crowe papers

Prizes and honours
 Donovan Cup for unpublished poetry October 1947, Society of New Zealand Women Writers and Artists, for the poem "Lazarus"
 Jessie Mackay Memorial Award for verse
1948 for the poem sequence "Sanatorium"
1949 for Lazarus and Other Poems
1967 co-winner for The Luthier and Other Poems
 Officer of the New Zealand Order of Merit for services to poetry, 2002 Queen's Birthday and Golden Jubilee Honours

Offices 
 In charge Physiotherapy Department Wellington Hospital, Otaki Branch
 Society of New Zealand Women Writers and Artists President and honorary vice-president
 New Zealand P.E.N. President
 Member of the New Zealand State Literary Fund Advisory Committee

Works about Ruth Gilbert

Reviews 
Lazarus and Other Poems
 Listener 10 March 1950 pp. 12–13 by W. Hart-Smith
 Landfall June 1950 pp. 162–163 by D. M. Anderson

The Sunlit Hour
 Here and Now May 1956 pp. 29–30
 Landfall June 1956 pp. 151–154 by C. K. Stead
 Listener 29 March 1956 pp. 2–13
 Number 6 March 1957 anonymously but by Louis Johnson with a follow-up acknowledging authorship in August 1957.

The Luthier and Other Poems
 Listener 25 November 1966 under the heading "A Traditionalist Poet" by James Bertram
 Dominion 24 November 1966 by Louis Johnson

Collected Poems
 Listener 3 November 1984 pp. 46–47 by Lauris Edmond
 Press 6 November 1984 by Heather McPherson

Mysterious Eve
 Dominion 1 April 1989 p. 9 by Michael Mintrom

Breathings; Dream, Black Night's Child
 Nelson Evening Mail 11 December 1993 p. 14 under the heading "Gilbert captures classical spirit" by Derek Bolt
 Journal of New Zealand Literature No. 14 1996 (pub. December 1998) p. 209 "Poetry Survey" by Michael Morrissey

Literary Biography 
Wright, F. W. Nielsen. Ruth Gilbert An Account of her Poetry: An Interpretative Study (1984). Cultural and Political Booklets, Wellington, 1985 

Wright, F. W. Nielsen. Salt and Snow An Essay (1972–1988) second edition incorporating Editorial Notes to Ruth Gilbert's Early Poems 1938–1944 and to More Early Poems 1939–1944. Cultural and Political Booklets, Wellington, 1989 

Wright, F. W. Nielsen. Theories of Style in the Schroder-Marris School of Poets in Aotearoa: An Essay in Formal Stylistics with Particular Reference to the Poets Eileen Duggan, Robin Hyde and Ruth Gilbert etc. Cultural and Political Booklets, Wellington 2001 

Wright, F. W. Nielsen. How about Honouring the New Zealand Poet Ruth Gilbert on her 85th Birthday: A Nomination. Original Books, Wellington 2001 

Wright, F. W. Nielsen. Celebrating Ruth Gilbert and the Triumph of Kiwi Georgianism: An Essay in the Literary History of Aoteaoa. Cultural and Political Booklets, Wellington, 2002 

Wright, F. W. Nielsen. A. R. D. Fairburn and the Women Poets of 1948 in Aotearoa. Cultural and Political Booklets, Wellington, 2007 

Wright, F. W. Nielsen. Noble Initiatives: Notes on Women's Writing in Aotearoa 1952–2002. Cultural and Political Booklets, Wellington, 2007 

Wright, F. W. Nielsen. Sketch Profile of Ruth Gilbert with Full Commentary Quoting Various Authors: A Compilation. Cultural and Political Booklets, Wellington, 2007 

Wright, F. W. Nielsen. Argybargy and the Big Dee. Cultural and Political Booklets, Wellington, 2009

Essays, articles, memoirs
 "Poet [Ruth Glbert] wins Jessie Mackay prize", New Zealand Listener 11 November 1949 p. 9
 "Poems on Anzac Day" New Zealand Listener 18 April 1952 p. 7. Radio broadcast of ANZAC poems by Ruth Gilbert reviewed 9 May 1952 page 8
 Holcroft, Monte. The Reluctant Editor Wellington, Reed. 1969 pp. 91–92 
 Stevens, Joan. "Gilbert, (Florence) Ruth" in Contemporary Poets of the English Language 3rd edition 1970 pp. 549–550 Dewey 821.9109
 Else, Anne. "Not more than man nor less: the treatment of women poets in Landfall, 1947–1961." Landfall 156 Dec.1985 pages 431–446
 Needham, John. "Recent Poetry and Coleridgean Principles." Journal of New Zealand Literature 3 1985 pages 35–56
 Virginia Blain, Patricia Clements and Isobel Grundy (eds). The Feminist Companion to English Literature, London, 1990 
 Roger Robinson and Nelson Wattie (eds). Oxford Companion to New Zealand Literature 1998

Theses 
French, Anne. Twelve Women Poets of New Zealand: Imperatives of Shape and Growth. University of Texas, 1967.

O'Leary, Michael. Social and Literary Constraints on Women Writers in New Zealand 1945 to 1970. Victoria University of Wellington, 2011.

References

External links 
Gilbert, Ruth. Representative Poetry Online. http://rpo.library.utoronto.ca/poet/gilbert-ruth

Ruth Gilbert, New Zealand Literature File,the University of Auckland.
 http://www.nzlf.auckland.ac.nz/author/?a_id=54

Ruth Gilbert, Poetry Archive London.
 http://www.poetryarchive.org/poetryarchive/singlePoet.do?poetId=16341

Aotearoa New Zealand Poetry Sound Archive: Ruth Gilbert.
 http://aonzpsa.blogspot.com/2007/11/gilbert-ruth.html

Featuring Ruth Gilbert Issue broadsheet new New Zealand poetry, 4 November 2009.http://broadsheetnz.files.wordpress.com/2011/02/issue04.pdf

Ruth Gilbert under Officer of Order of New Zealand in The Queen's Birthday and Golden Jubilee Honours DPMC.
 http://www.dpmc.govt.nz/node/384

O’Leary, Michael. Social and Literary Constraints on Women Writers in New Zealand 1945 to 1970. Victoria University of Wellington, 2011. Go to Chapter 5 researcharchive http://researcharchive.vuw.ac.nz/bitstream/handle/10063/1652/thesis.pdf

Ruth Gilbert's photo is published at http://www.digitalnz.org/records/22585657

1917 births
2016 deaths
20th-century New Zealand poets
New Zealand women poets
Officers of the New Zealand Order of Merit
People from Greytown, New Zealand
People educated at Hamilton Girls' High School
20th-century New Zealand women writers